Adriana Partimpim is an album by the Brazilian singer and songwriter Adriana Calcanhotto. Partimpim is a nickname of Calcanhotto in her childhood. This was Calcanhotto's first album for children.

Tracks 
 "Lição de Baião" (03:16)
 "Oito Anos" (03:08)
 "Lig-Lig-Lig-Lé" (02:38)
 "Fico Assim Sem Você" (03:08)
 "Canção da Falsa Tartaruga" (04:07)
 "Formiga Bossa Nova" (02:28)
 "Ciranda da Bailarina" (04:49)
 "Ser de Sagitário" (03:03)
 "Borboleta" (02:30)
 "Saiba" (03:01)

References

External links 
 Official Site

2004 albums